The Masaryk circuit or Masarykring, also referred to as the Brno Circuit, refers to two motorsport race tracks located in Brno, Czech Republic.
The original street circuit was made up of public roads, and at its longest measured . In 1949, events such as the Czechoslovakian Grand Prix attracted top teams and drivers. The track is named after the first president of Czechoslovakia, Tomáš Garrigue Masaryk. Racing on the old roads ended after 1986, when the new (current) circuit was opened.

The annual Motorcycle Grand Prix of the Czech Republic is the circuit's most important event. It had been held here since 1950 and was the most famous motor race in the Czech Republic. The race was part of the World Grand Prix in the years of 1965–1982, 1987–1991, 1993–2020.

The FIA World Touring Car Championship, FIA GT1 World Championship, Formula Two and the Superbike World Championship also raced at the circuit.

The Czech Republic Motorcycle Grand Prix was more of a promoter event than a profit-raiser itself. Since tobacco advertising has been banned in 2007, it is common among the other MotoGP events. The Brno Circuit is historically one of the oldest circuits, on the place were also held the most motorcycle championships in history after the TT Circuit Assen.

Original circuits
The circuit went east past Kamenny and then went north past the Bohunice University Campus in Kejbaly, and went through the villages of Libusino, Kohouvotice and Žebětín, out to Ostrovacice, through Veselka and back through a series of fast straights and kinks. From 1930 to 1937, the Masaryk circuit races attracted some of the top drivers and teams.

On September 25, 1949, the race was held for the first and the last time in Czechoslovakia as part of the Grand Prix motor racing (later evolved into Formula One). The Czechoslovakian Grand Prix in 1949 was run clockwise on a shorter  layout, which turned right at Veselka, bypassed Ostrovacice and entered Žebětín from the south rather than the west. In spite of a crowd in excess of 400,000 people, this would be the last Grand Prix for cars on the old circuit.

Beginning in 1950, the circuit played host to the Czechoslovakian motorcycle Grand Prix, which became a world championship event from 1965.

Modern circuit
The current  permanent road racing circuit was opened in 1987. It lies north of Kyvalka, within the bounds of the circuit used in the 1930s, but not incorporating any of the public roads. The motorcycle race moved to the new circuit and regained its status as a round of the world championship. A World Sports Car Championship race was held in 1988, and a round of the A1 Grand Prix series in 2006. It was also the location of the 24H Epilog of Brno (previously 6 Hours of Brno).

Layout history

Lap records

The unofficial lap record is 1.34:700 set by Jérôme d'Ambrosio in Renault R29 Formula One car in 2010, while the official race lap records at the modern layout of Brno Circuit are listed as:

Events

 Current
 April: LeBrno Series
 May: Histo-Cup Austria
 July: Alpe Adria International Motorcycle Championship
 September: TCR Eastern Europe Trophy, BOSS GP Masaryk Racing Days, ACCR Formula 4 Championship, Austria Formula 3 Cup
 October: LeBrno Series

 Former
 24H Series 12 Hours of Brno (2015–2016, 2019)
 A1 Grand Prix (2006–2007)
 Auto GP (2002–2005, 2010–2011, 2013, 2016)
 Czechoslovakian Grand Prix (1930–1935, 1937, 1949, 1976–1988)
 Deutsche Tourenwagen Masters (2004–2005)
 Deutsche Tourenwagen Meisterschaft (1988, 1991–1992)
 European Touring Car Championship (1968–1972, 1975–1986, 2000–2004)
 European Touring Car Cup (2013, 2015)
 FIA GT Championship (2000–2008)
 FIA GT1 World Championship (2010)
 FIA Sportscar Championship Brno 2 Hours 30 Minutes (1997–2002)
 FIM Endurance World Championship (2001–2003)
 Formula 3 Euro Series (2004)
 Formula Renault Eurocup (2004, 2010)
 Grand Prix motorcycle racing Czech Republic motorcycle Grand Prix (1965–1982, 1987–1991, 1993–2020)
 Sidecar World Championship (1969–1982, 1987–1991, 1993–1997)
 Superbike World Championship (1993–1996, 2005–2012, 2018)
 World Series by Renault (2010)
 World Sportscar Championship 360 km of Brno (1988)
 World Touring Car Championship FIA WTCC Race of the Czech Republic (2006–2011)

Gallery

See also

 Autodrom Most: Other race track in the Czech republic

Notes

References

External links

Official Webpage
Map and circuit history at RacingCircuits.info
Maps of the old track
Trackpedia's guide to driving the Brno circuit
The best place to stand at Automotodrom Brno
Satellite picture from Google Maps

Motorsport venues in the Czech Republic
Superbike World Championship circuits
Grand Prix motorcycle circuits
A1 Grand Prix circuits
Sport in Brno
Buildings and structures in Brno
World Touring Car Championship circuits
1930 establishments in Czechoslovakia
1987 establishments in Czechoslovakia
Sports venues completed in 1930
Sports venues completed in 1987
20th-century architecture in the Czech Republic